Rajae El Mouhandiz also known as Rajae (born 25 March 1979) is a Dutch-Moroccan/Algerian poet, singer, storyteller and composer.

Early life
Rajae El Mouhandiz was born in Larache, Morocco, to an Algerian mother and a Moroccan father, Habiba Cherkaoui and Ahmed El Mouhandiz. Her parents moved to Amsterdam when she was a baby. After her parents' separation in 1982, El Mouhandiz spent her childhood with her mother and siblings in Amsterdam.

Career
While in primary school and high school, El Mouhandiz attended extensive ballet classes and studied the French horn. At the age of sixteen she was the first North-African to study at a Dutch conservatory where she continued her classical music studies. At the age of 20, El Mouhandiz left classical music to follow her own artistic path, seeking to incorporate her cultural roots.

On International Women's Day 2012, El Mouhandiz premiered her first short doc film, a short film about the acceptance of Muslim women in mainstream media and the music industry.

El Mouhandiz is also one of the 60 female curators of the international MUSLIMA exhibition.

From 2009 to 2018, El Mouhandiz was nominated on the list of the 500 most influential Muslims in the world for her work in the field of culture & art.

On 31 October 2013, El Mouhandiz gave her first TEDx talk during TEDx Breda. In her talk she spoke about how art and music create a new hybrid global culture. She still continues to sing and publish music of her own.

Discography

Albums
 2006: Incarnation
 2009: Hand Of Fatima
 2013: single - Gracefully
 2015: EP- "Watani"

Compilations and features
2003 Hind – Summer all over again
2005 EMI/Funda – Fundamentally Dinner Time
2006 Licksamba Music – Licksamba
2006 Difference Portugal – Brazilounge – Vol. 4
2007 Water Music Records Costa Del Sur – Excursions In Laid Back Chill
2007 Amir Sulaiman/Dj BLM/Anas Canon – Broad Daylight
2007 Dj BLM/Anas Canon – Songs In The Key Of Iman
2007 Chris Hinze/Dalai Lama – Tibet Impressions vol.3
2007 Van Meeteren & Hyde – Love Peace & Terror
2007 Raymzter/Rick D./Amnesty International – Maak Lawaai
2009 Raymzter/Jiggy Djé – De Frontlinie
2010 Water Music Records – Cocktail Essentials
2011 Melkkleuren – Milk for Today
 2013 Water Music Records - Hotel Chill 6

Music videos
2007 Raymzter/Rick D./Amnesty International – Maak Lawaai
2007 Dadara, Van Meeteren & Hyde – Love Peace & Terror
2010 Rajae – Malcolm Lateef Shabazz
2011 Melkkleuren – Milk for Today
2013 Rajae - Gracefully

Music theatre, exhibition, film and acting
2007 Dutch Theatre Tour and recordings in Ibiza for "Serieuzere Zaken' with Raymzter and Chris Hinze.  
2007 "Conversations With Ice" by Sahr Ngaujah – Over 't IJ 2007. The question of Value (Who decides Who buys), within the context of the global diamond trade, Sierra Leone’s child soldiers, and its links to the Bling sub-culture in Hip-Hop.
2008 Cameo appearance in a TV series "Flow" on Dutch broadcaster NPS 
2013 Co-written, co-produced and acted in her first Short documentary film ¡HOPE!
2013 Curator and artist in the international MUSLIMA Exhibition
2013 TEDx talk; How art and music create a new hybrid global culture.
2014 KRO, Recht uit het Hart
2012 Hijabi Monologen NL 
2017 Music theatre production: Thuis, Ontheemd #1
2018 Music theatre production: Thuis, Ontheemd #2

References

External links
Rajae El Mouhandiz – official website.

1979 births
Living people
People from Larache
Musicians from Amsterdam
Dutch people of Riffian descent
Dutch people of Moroccan-Berber descent
Dutch Muslims
Performers of Islamic music
Moroccan emigrants to the Netherlands
Dutch people of Algerian descent
21st-century Dutch women singers
21st-century Dutch singers